Sergio Rodríguez García (born 17 August 1984), commonly known as Rodri, is a Spanish former professional footballer who played as a central defender.

Club career
Born in Mataró, Barcelona, Catalonia, Rodri was a product of FC Barcelona's youth system. He played only two La Liga games with the first team over the course of two seasons, his first being on 11 December 2004 in a 2–1 away win against Albacete Balompié (three minutes played), and Barça were eventually crowned back-to-back champions in his second year, although he was mainly registered with the B-side.

During the summer of 2006, Rodri was purchased by Galicia's Deportivo de La Coruña, making just six competitive appearances for the main squad in two seasons. In January 2007, he was loaned to second division club UD Almería, playing the entire 2007–08 campaign with Polideportivo Ejido, also in that tier and in Andalusia.

Rodri was again loaned by Depor in September 2008, joining Portuguese Primeira Liga team C.S. Marítimo. However, not having been used during his brief spell, he returned to A Coruña, moving in January 2009 to another Spanish division two side, UD Salamanca.

In late July 2009, Rodri was released by Deportivo and stayed in the second tier, signing a 1+1 contract with Hércules CF. In his first year he experienced his best season as a professional, scoring four goals in 38 matches as the Alicante club returned to the top flight after a 13-year absence.

Rodri appeared in 13 games for Hércules in 2010–11, mainly due to injury or suspension to habitual starters Abraham Paz and Noé Pamarot. In March 2011, he moved to FC Spartak Moscow in Russia for €400,000, signing a one-year deal.

After his contract ended, Rodri left Spartak. On 31 August 2012, he returned to his homeland and joined Rayo Vallecano. After two years in the Belgian First Division B with K.A.S. Eupen, he resumed his career in the Spanish lower leagues.

References

External links

1984 births
Living people
People from Mataró
Sportspeople from the Province of Barcelona
Spanish footballers
Footballers from Catalonia
Association football defenders
La Liga players
Segunda División players
Segunda División B players
Tercera División players
FC Barcelona C players
FC Barcelona Atlètic players
FC Barcelona players
Deportivo de La Coruña players
UD Almería players
Polideportivo Ejido footballers
UD Salamanca players
Hércules CF players
Rayo Vallecano players
UE Costa Brava players
CE L'Hospitalet players
C.S. Marítimo players
Russian Premier League players
FC Spartak Moscow players
Challenger Pro League players
K.A.S. Eupen players
Spain youth international footballers
Spanish expatriate footballers
Expatriate footballers in Portugal
Expatriate footballers in Russia
Expatriate footballers in Belgium
Spanish expatriate sportspeople in Portugal
Spanish expatriate sportspeople in Russia
Spanish expatriate sportspeople in Belgium